Gamma Capricorni or γ Capricorni, formally named Nashira, is a giant star in the constellation of Capricornus. Based on parallax measurements obtained during the Hipparcos mission, it is located at a distance of approximately 157 light-years from the Sun. The star is drifting closer with a radial velocity of −31 km/s. It is 2.56 degrees south of the ecliptic, so it can be occulted by the Moon, and (rarely) by planets.

Nomenclature
γ Capricorni (Latinised to Gamma Capricorni) is the star's Bayer designation.

It bore the traditional name Nashira, derived from the Arabic سعد ناشرة sa'd nashirah "the lucky one" or "bearer of good news". In 2016, the International Astronomical Union organized a Working Group on Star Names (WGSN) to catalogue and standardize proper names for stars. The WGSN approved the name Nashira for this star on 21 August 2016 and it is now so included in the List of IAU-approved Star Names.

Namesake
Nashira (AK-85) was a United States Navy ship, though it was never commissioned and never bore the USS designation.

Properties

γ Capricorni is classified as a hot chemically peculiar Am star with a mean apparent magnitude of +3.67. The spectrum displays abundance anomalies of the elements strontium, chromium, and europium. It was first classified as an Am star in 1965 by K. Osawa, but in 1974 C. Bertaud and M. Floquet found it to be an Ap star with a strontium abundance anomaly. In 1998, F. A. Catalano and associates found a slight variability in the infrared J band with a period of 2.78 days, which suggests the Ap classification is correct. However, no magnetic field is detected, which points to the Am classification, as does the infrared spectrum. The star displays large radial velocity variations, which could be explained by star spots and rotation. Alternatively it may be a double-lined spectroscopic binary viewed from nearly pole-on.

This star is classified as an α2 Canum Venaticorum type variable star and its brightness varies by 0.03 magnitudes. It has 2.44 times the mass and 2.35 times the radius of the Sun. O. J. Eggen included it as a member of the Hyades Stream.

References

External links

F-type main-sequence stars
Am stars
Alpha2 Canum Venaticorum variables
Hyades Stream

Capricorni, Gamma
Capricornus (constellation)
Durchmusterung objects
Capricorni, 40
206088
106985
8278
Nashira